Sex Among Allies (full title: Sex Among Allies: Military Prostitution in U.S.-Korea Relations) is a study by American academic Katharine Moon on prostitution around US Military bases in South Korea during the 1970s. This study was published in 1997.

ISBN

See also
Prostitutes in South Korea for the U.S. military

References

1997 non-fiction books
Books about South Korea
Non-fiction books about prostitution
History of South Korea
Prostitution in South Korea
United States military in South Korea
Works set in the 1970s
Non-fiction books about military history of the United States